Thomas Grimes was an English politician.

Thomas Grimes may also refer to:
Thomas Wingfield Grimes (1844–1905), American politician
Tom Grimes, American novelist, playwright and creative writing instructor